Rini may refer to:

Places 
 Rini, Uttarakhand, a village in Chamoli district, India, known for the 2021 glacier flood disaster
 Rini and Rhini, transliterations of the Xhosa name of Makhanda (formerly Grahamstown), South Africa
 Mutiara Rini, a suburb in Iskandar Puteri, Johor Bahru District, Johor, Malaysia

Given name 
 Rini Bell, Honorine Bell (born 1981), American actress
 Rini Budiarti (born 1983), Indonesian athletics competitor
 Rini Coolen (born 1967), Dutch retired football defender and manager
 Rini Dobber, Catharina Clasina Dobber (born 1943), retired Dutch swimmer
 Rini Mulder (1953–2007), killed by police in Utrecht, Netherlands
 Rini Price (1941–2019), American painter and visual artist
 Rini Simon Khanna (born 1964), Indian television news anchor
 Rini Soemarno (born 1958), Indonesian economist and politician
 Rini Templeton, Lucille Corinne Templeton (1935–1986), American graphic artist, sculptor, and political activist
 Rini Tsukino, fictional manga character also known as Chibiusa
 Rini van Woerden (1934–2004), Dutch footballer
 Rini Wagtmans, Marinus Wagtmans (born 1946), former Dutch professional road bicycle racer
 Rini Wulandari (born 1984), Indonesian pop singer

Surname
 Paige Rini (born 2000), Canadian water skier

See also 
 Riny Kuijf (born 1960), Dutch chess International Master
 Chibiusa, known as Rini in the DiC Entertainment and Cloverway dubs Sailor Moon
 Reni (disambiguation)
 Raini (disambiguation)